Denis Dyachenko (born May 25, 1986) is a Ukrainian footballer who plays as a midfielder with Toronto Falcons.

Career

Ukraine 
Dyachenko began his career in 2003 with Arsenal Kiev in the Ukrainian Premier League, but played in the Ukrainian Second League with FC Arsenal-2 Kyiv. In 2005, he signed with Illichivets Mariupol, where he was loaned to their reserve team FC Illichivets-2 Mariupol. He played in the Ukrainian First League originally in 2008 with FC Feniks-Illichovets Kalinine.

The following season he remained in the second tier by signing with Stal Alchevsk. After a single season with Stal, he departed from the club. In total, he played in 6 matches with Alchevk.

In 2010, he returned to the third tier to sign with FC Poltava. After the conclusion of the season he departed from Poltava. He later had stints with FC Dynamo Khmelnytskyi, and FC Stal Kamianske.

Canada 
In 2017, he went abroad to play in the Canadian Soccer League with FC Vorkuta. In his debut season, he assisted in securing the First Division title. Vorkuta would defeat Royal Toronto FC in the opening round of the postseason. The club was eliminated from the playoffs in the next round by Scarborough SC. He re-signed with Vorkuta for the 2018 season. In his second season with the club, he assisted in securing the CSL Championship.  

After the conclusion of the summer season he played indoor soccer in the Arena Premier League with Ukraine AC. For the 2019 CSL season, he was transferred to the expansion franchise Kingsman SC. 

In 2022, he returned to the CSL to play with the expansion franchise Toronto Falcons.

References 

1986 births
Living people
Ukrainian footballers
FC Arsenal Kyiv players
FC Arsenal-2 Kyiv players
FC Illichivets-2 Mariupol players
FC Feniks-Illichovets Kalinine players
FC Stal Alchevsk players
FC Poltava players
FC Dynamo Khmelnytskyi players
FC Stal Kamianske players
FC Continentals players
Toronto Atomic FC players
Canadian Soccer League (1998–present) players
Association football midfielders
Ukrainian First League players
Ukrainian Second League players
Sportspeople from Dnipropetrovsk Oblast